Ragnar Tørnquist (born 31 July 1970) is a Norwegian game designer and author. He has been working for Funcom in Oslo since 1994, and has founded his own studio Red Thread Games in November 2012.

Biography
Tørnquist studied art, history and English at St Clare's, a school in Oxford from 1987 to 1989. From 1989 to 1990, he studied philosophy and English at the University of Oslo. After that, from 1990 to 1993 he attended the Undergraduate Film and Television department at the New York University's Tisch School of the Arts. His influences included Joss Whedon and Neil Gaiman.

In 1994, he returned to Oslo, Norway and started working for Funcom as producer, designer, writer, and level-editor of the video game adaptation of Casper. He is credited with popularizing the term "modern adventure" a genre of contemporary adventure game design that began with games such as The Longest Journey, Broken Sword, and Syberia. He felt that a new term was needed for this new generation of adventure games since "the classic point-and-click 'graphical adventure' is dead... The point of the 'modern adventure' [...] is to bring adventure gaming back into the mainstream, and to use technology and gameplay advances to bring the genre forward into the 'next generation'."

On 1 November 2012, Funcom announced that Tørnquist founded an independent game development studio Red Thread Games, which will continue developing The Longest Journey IP under license from Funcom. Simultaneously, Tørnquist stepped down as the Game Director of The Secret World to devote more time to the third entry in TLJ series, Dreamfall Chapters, while still working on TSW as the Creative Director.

Tørnquist is married and has one daughter.

Game credits
 Casper (1996)
 Dragonheart: Fire & Steel (1996)
 The Longest Journey (1999)
 Anarchy Online (2001)
 Dreamfall: The Longest Journey (2006)
 The Secret World (2012)
 Dreamfall Chapters (2014–16)
 Draugen (2019)
 Dustborn (TBA)
  Svalbard (TBA)

Novels
 Anarchy Online – Prophet Without Honour (2001)

Short stories
 Rules are Rules

Screenplays
 In  the Dark Places

References

External links
 
 
 
 Red Thread Games website

1970 births
Living people
The Longest Journey
Norwegian bloggers
Norwegian video game designers
People educated at St. Clare's, Oxford
Tisch School of the Arts alumni
University of Oslo alumni
Video game designers
Video game writers
Norwegian voice directors